

A nef is an extravagant table ornament and container used in the Middle Ages and Renaissance, made of precious metals in the shape of a ship – nef was another word for a carrack in French.  If not just used for decoration, it could hold salt or spices (the latter being very expensive in the Middle Ages), or cutlery, or even napkins. The large nef depicted in the well-known calendar miniature for January from the Très Riches Heures du Duc de Berry is being used to hold, and perhaps wash, gilt dishes from the table service. 

Nefs are recorded in France as early as 1239, initially consisting of just the hull, and perhaps initially used to drink from; by the 14th century the most elaborate had masts, sails and even crew, and had become too crowded with such details to be used as containers for anything. The so-called Mechanical Galleon in the British Museum is a late 16th-century German nef which was also a clock and automaton, with moving figures and music.

A nef was usually made of silver, silver-gilt or gold, often further embellished with enamel and jewels.  A nautilus shell often formed the hull of the ship, as in the Burghley Nef (illustrated). Some nefs had wheels to allow them to be rolled from one end of the table to the other, but most had legs or pedestals.  The nef was placed in front of the most important person at table as a mark of their status.

The equivalent in religious plate is a navicula, Latin for small ship, and also a term in English for a boat-shaped incense-holder.

Gallery of decorative nefs

See also 
 Schlüsselfelder Ship

Notes

References

Further reading 
Oman, Charles (1963). Medieval Silver Nefs.  London: Her Majesty's Stationery Office.
Truman, Charles (1989). "Ships on Board". Country Life, vol. 183, no. 38: 218-221.

External links 

Nefs in the Middle Ages and Renaissance Links to nefs in museums, as well as medieval illustrations of nefs, demonstrating the range of uses for pre-17th century nefs.

Serving and dining
Silver objects
Silver-gilt objects
Marine art
Medieval European metalwork objects
Edible salt